Gajineh may refer to:

 Ganjineh-ye Zaruni
 Sarab-e Ahmadvand